Windows Update MiniTool (also called WUMT) is a freeware application client released in 2015. It was created by a programmer named stupid user, based in Russia. The program is written in English, Spanish, Korean and Russian languages.

It is an alternative to Windows Update, used for searching important updates for the Microsoft Windows operating systems by allowing users to search, install, postpone, and disable updates. It only supports Windows NT-based operating systems running in 32-bit or 64-bit versions.

Interface & Features
The interface is divided into a sidebar that runs the program's function. The options are:

Query the update server.
Download selected updates but don't install.
Download and install selected updates.
Uninstall selected updates.
Hide (block) selected updates.
Copy the information to the clipboard.

Reception
The software received favorable reviews. Softpedia gave it a 4.5/5 with editor, Giorgiana Arghire wrote, "If you want to make sure that you do not forget about the postponed updates, you can use Windows Update MiniTool, as it allows you to download and install them when you choose."

Legacy
As Microsoft announced that they would disable the Windows Update service for SHA-1 endpoints for Windows 2000, Windows XP, Windows Server 2003, and Windows Vista in 2020, users can use the WUMT tool to get automatic updates working for these operating systems, through the Windows Server Update Services Server.

References

Windows-only freeware
C++ software